The Church of St Mary Steps is a Grade I Listed church in the city of Exeter, England.

History 

The church dates from about 1150 and was rebuilt in the 15th century. It was formerly by the west gate of the city.

In the late 19th century the church was restored by the architect Edward Ashworth.

Benefice of Heavitree and St Mary Steps

Parishes within the benefice:
Heavitree (St Michael and All Angels) with St Lawrence and St Paul
 St Mary Steps

References

Further reading
 Nicholas Orme The Churches of Medieval Exeter. Exeter: Impress Books, 2014; pp. 137 & 139

Exeter, Mary
Exeter, Mary
Mary Steps